The FINA Synchronised Swimming World Trophy is an annual, international synchronised swimming event, organized by FINA. To highlight the beauty of synchronised swimming, this competition differ from other top-level international competitions: scores are given for the Artistic Impression only, accessories or equipment are permitted, etc. It was first held in 2006.

For the event, 8-12 nations are invited to compete, based on their rankings from recent FINA World Championships and the Olympic Games.

Editions

Event codes:  S= Free-Solo, D= Duet, DF= Duet-Free, DT= Duet-Thematic, T= Team, TF= Team-Free, FC= Free Combination, SH=Synchro Highlight routine.

References

 
Recurring sporting events established in 2006
Synchronised swimming competitions